Crown Point is a mountain with a summit elevation of  located in the Sierra Nevada mountain range, in Mono County of northern California, United States. The summit is set in the Hoover Wilderness on land managed by Humboldt–Toiyabe National Forest, whereas the lower southwest slope is set within Yosemite National Park and Tuolumne County. The first ascent of the summit was made in 1905 by George R. Davis, Albert Hale Sylvester, and Pearson Chapman, all with the United States Geological Survey.

Climate
According to the Köppen climate classification system, Crown Point is located in an alpine climate zone. Most weather fronts originate in the Pacific Ocean, and travel east toward the Sierra Nevada mountains. As fronts approach, they are forced upward by the peaks, causing moisture in the form of rain or snowfall to drop onto the range (orographic lift). Precipitation runoff from this mountain drains into headwaters of Robinson Creek which is a tributary of the Walker River, as well as west into Rancheria Creek which is a Tuolumne River tributary.

Gallery

See also

 List of mountain peaks of California

References

External links
 Weather forecast: Crown Point

Mountains of Mono County, California
Mountains of Yosemite National Park
North American 3000 m summits
Mountains of Northern California
Sierra Nevada (United States)
Humboldt–Toiyabe National Forest
Mountains of Tuolumne County, California